Gianni Lonzi (born August 4, 1938) is an Italian water polo player who competed in the 1960 Summer Olympics, in the 1964 Summer Olympics, and in the 1968 Summer Olympics.

He was born in Florence.

In 1960 he was a member of the Italian water polo team which won the gold medal. He played five matches.

Four years later he finished fourth with the Italian team in the water polo competition at the Tokyo Games. He played six matches.

At the 1968 Games he was part of the Italian team which finished again fourth in the Olympic water polo tournament. He played all nine matches.

As a head coach, Lonzi led Italy men's national team to win an Olympic silver medal in 1976, becoming one of a few sportspeople who won Olympic medals in water polo as players and head coaches.

He is married from 1968 with the Italian fencer Olympic Champion Antonella Ragno.

See also
 Italy men's Olympic water polo team records and statistics
 List of Olympic champions in men's water polo
 List of Olympic medalists in water polo (men)
 List of world champions in men's water polo
 List of members of the International Swimming Hall of Fame

References

External links
 

1938 births
Living people
Italian male water polo players
Water polo players at the 1960 Summer Olympics
Water polo players at the 1964 Summer Olympics
Water polo players at the 1968 Summer Olympics
Olympic gold medalists for Italy in water polo
Medalists at the 1960 Summer Olympics
Italian water polo coaches
Italy men's national water polo team coaches
Water polo coaches at the 1976 Summer Olympics
Sportspeople from Florence